Nationality words link to articles with information on the nation's poetry or literature (for instance, Irish or France).

Events

Works published

 Thomas Cooke, Marlborough, the Duke of Marlborough died June 16
 Hildebrand Jacob, Bedlam, published this year, although the book states "1723"
 Thomas Parnell, Poems on Several Occasions
 Allan Ramsay, Fables and Tales
 Elizabeth Thomas, Miscellany Poems on Several Subjects, published anonymously
 Thomas Walter, The Sweet Psalmist of Israel, English, Colonial American

Births
Death years link to the corresponding "[year] in poetry" article:
 February 7 – Azar Bigdeli (died 1781), Persian anthologist and poet
 February 26 – Mary Leapor (died 1746), English kitchenmaid poet
 April 11 – Christopher Smart (died 1771), English poet
 April 22 (bapt.) – Joseph Warton (died 1800), English poet and critic
 December 1 – Anna Louisa Karsch (died 1804), German
 Waris Shah (died 1798), Punjabi Sufi poet

Deaths
Death years link to the corresponding "[year] in poetry" article:
 September 26 – Guillaume Massieu (born 1665), French churchman, translator and poet

See also

 Poetry
 List of years in poetry
 List of years in literature
 18th century in poetry
 18th century in literature
 Augustan poetry
 Scriblerus Club

Notes

 "A Timeline of English Poetry" Web page of the Representative Poetry Online Web site, University of Toronto

18th-century poetry
Poetry